This is a list of events in British radio during 1986.

Events
The Home Office sanctions six experiments of split programming on Independent Local Radio. Up to ten hours a week of split programming is allowed. These include Welsh language programmes on Marcher Sound, Asian programming on Leicester Sound and rugby league commentary on Viking Radio.
A European-wide re-organisation of band 2 of the VHF band comes into effect in July 1987. In preparation for this, 1986 sees many local stations change their VHF/FM frequency.

January
5 January – Michael Parkinson takes over as host of Desert Island Discs following the death last year of Roy Plomley.

February
No events

March
30 March –  Bruno Brookes replaces  Richard Skinner as host of BBC Radio 1's Top 40 show.

April
 7 April – Derek Jameson takes over The Radio 2 Breakfast Show breakfast show from Ken Bruce.
 18 April – Mike Read presents his final Radio 1 Breakfast Show after five years in the hot seat.

May
 5 May – Mike Smith takes over the Radio 1 breakfast show. The same day also sees Radio 1 begin broadcasting on weekdays 30 minutes earlier, at 5:30am.

June
 28 June – At midday, Portsmouth station Radio Victory stops broadcasting after more than ten years on air, three months before its broadcast licence was due to expire. The previous year the Independent Broadcasting Authority had announced that it would not renew the station's licence.

July
 24 July – Pirate Radio 4 returns for a second run of three more editions and is again broadcast on the VHF/FM frequencies of BBC Radio 4 with the usual Radio 4 schedule continuing on long wave. The programme is shorter in length than last year, being on air from 9:05am until 10:45am.

August
 25 August – An early evening service of specialist music programmes launches on the BBC's four local radio stations in Yorkshire. The programmes are broadcast on weeknights between 6pm and 7:30pm.

September
 30 September – BBC Radio Jersey begins experimental broadcasting of States of Jersey proceedings. The broadcasts are made a permanent feature from 25 November.

October
 1 October – Downtown Radio's broadcast area is expanded when it begins broadcasting to the north western area of Northern Ireland.
 12 October – Ocean Sound begins broadcasting. It replaces Radio Victory in East Hampshire, but also covers Southampton, Winchester and the Isle of Wight. Ocean Sound launches as a split frequency service - Ocean Sound West on 103.2 FM and 1557 AM and Ocean Sound East operates as the replacement for Radio Victory on 97.5 FM and 1170 AM - due to management identifying two potential audiences: one familiar with commercial radio (in the East area), and one largely acquainted with the BBC (the West area). Ocean Sound East launches with a livelier sound than the West service although both services share breakfast and evening programmes with split programming airing during daytime.

November
November – Following its purchase of Northants 96, Chiltern Radio launches a networked service called The Hot FM. The service is broadcast on three ILR licenses with local programming restricted to mid-mornings.
30 November – Northants 96 launches at 10 am and becomes part of The Hot FM.

December
24 December – John Timpson presents The Today programme for the final time.
28 December – Apna Hi Ghar Samajhiye (Make Yourself at Home) is broadcast on BBC Radio 4 for the final time. It had been broadcast on Radio 4 and the BBC Home Service every Sunday morning since 1965.

Station debuts
12 October – Ocean Sound
5 November – BBC Radio Essex
30 November – Northants 96

Changes of station frequency

Closing this year
28 June – Radio Victory (1975–1986)

Programme debuts
 4 January – Loose Ends on BBC Radio 4 (1986–Present)
 14 July – Counterpoint on BBC Radio 4 (1986–Present)

Continuing radio programmes

1940s
 Sunday Half Hour (1940–2018)
 Desert Island Discs (1942–Present)
 Down Your Way (1946–1992)
 Letter from America (1946–2004)
 Woman's Hour (1946–Present)
 A Book at Bedtime (1949–Present)

1950s
 The Archers (1950–Present)
 The Today Programme (1957–Present)
 Sing Something Simple (1959–2001)
 Your Hundred Best Tunes (1959–2007)

1960s
 Farming Today (1960–Present)
 In Touch (1961–Present)
 The World at One (1965–Present)
 The Official Chart (1967–Present)
 Just a Minute (1967–Present)
 The Living World (1968–Present)
 The Organist Entertains (1969–2018)

1970s
 PM (1970–Present)
 Start the Week (1970–Present)
 Week Ending (1970–1998)
 You and Yours (1970–Present)
 I'm Sorry I Haven't a Clue (1972–Present)
 Good Morning Scotland (1973–Present)
 Kaleidoscope (1973–1998)
 Newsbeat (1973–Present)
 The News Huddlines (1975–2001)
 File on 4 (1977–Present)
 Money Box (1977–Present)
 The News Quiz (1977–Present)
 Breakaway (1979–1998)
 Feedback (1979–Present)
 The Food Programme (1979–Present)
 Science in Action (1979–Present)

1980s
 Radio Active (1980–1987)
 In Business (1983–Present)
 Sounds of the 60s (1983–Present)
 Delve Special (1984–1987)
 After Henry (1985–1989)

Ending this year
 Unknown – Pirate Radio Four on BBC Radio 4 (1985–1986)

Births
25 February – Jameela Jamil, model and broadcast presenter
8 July – Alice Levine, broadcast presenter and style guru
9 September – Nikki Bedi née Vijaykar, broadcast presenter

Deaths
19 March – Elisabeth Barker, 75, current affairs radio administrator

See also 
 1986 in British music
 1986 in British television
 1986 in the United Kingdom
 List of British films of 1986

References

Radio
British Radio, 1986 In
Years in British radio